Blattidae is a cockroach family in the order Blattodea containing several of the most common household cockroaches.  Notable species include:

 Blatta orientalis:  Oriental cockroach, 
 Common shining cockroach: (Drymaplaneta communis)
 Florida woods cockroach: (Eurycotis floridana)
 Periplaneta spp: American cockroach, Australian cockroach, Brown cockroach, Smokybrown cockroach
 Shelfordella spp: Turkestan cockroach
 Botany Bay cockroach: (Polyzosteria limbata)

Subfamilies and genera

Archiblattinae
Auth. Kirby, 1904; distribution: SE Asia
 Archiblatta Snellen van Vollenhoven, 1862
 Catara Walker, 1868
 Protagonista Latreille, 1810

Blattinae
Auth. Latreille, 1810; distribution: Worldwide; synonym Duchailluiinae Roth, 2003

 Afrostylopyga Anisyutkin, 2014
 Apterisca Princis, 1963
 Blatta Linnaeus, 1758
 Brinckella Princis, 1963
 Cartoblatta Shelford, 1910
 Celatoblatta  Johns, 1966
 Deropeltis Burmeister, 1838
 Dorylaea Stål, 1877
 Duchailluia Rehn, 1933
 Eroblatta Shelford, 1910
 Eumethana Princis, 1951
 Hebardina Bei-Bienko, 1938
 Henicotyle Rehn & Hebard, 1927
 Homalosilpha Stål, 1874
 Macrostylopyga Anisyutkin, Anichkin & Thinh, 2013
 Maoriblatta Princis, 1966
 Mimosilpha Bei-Bienko, 1957
 Miostylopyga Princis, 1966
 Neostylopyga Shelford, 1911
 Pelmatosilpha Dohrn, 1887
 Periplaneta Burmeister, 1838
 Pseudoderopeltis Krauss, 1890
 Scabinopsis Bei-Bienko, 1969
 Shelfordella Adelung, 1910
 Thyrsocera Burmeister, 1838
†Bubosa  Burmese amber, Myanmar, Cenomanian

Macrocercinae
Auth. Roth, 1993; distribution: Australasia
 Macrocerca Hanitsch, 1930

Polyzosteriinae
Auth. Tepper, 1893; distribution: central & south America, Pacific islands, Australasia
 Anamesia Tepper, 1893
 Cosmozosteria Stål, 1874
 Desmozosteria Shelford, 1909
 Drymaplaneta Tepper, 1893
 Eppertia Shaw, 1925
 Eurycotis Stål, 1874
 Euzosteria Shelford, 1909
Laevifaciesquadrialata 
Leptozosteria Tepper, 1893
 Megazosteria Mackerras, 1966
 Melanozosteria Stål, 1874
 Methana Stål, 1877
 Platyzosteria Brunner von Wattenwyl, 1865
 Polyzosteria Burmeister, 1838
 Pseudolampra Tepper, 1893
 Scabina Shelford, 1909
 Temnelytra Tepper, 1893
 Zonioploca Stål, 1874

References

External links
 Gallery of cockroaches
 
 

 
Cockroaches